The Ambassador of the United Kingdom to Slovakia is the United Kingdom's foremost diplomatic representative to the Slovak Republic.

Slovakia became an independent state on 1 January 1993 after the peaceful dissolution of Czechoslovakia. From then until 1994 David Brighty, who had been British ambassador to Czechoslovakia, continued as both ambassador to the new Czech Republic and also non-resident ambassador to Slovakia. In 1994 David Brighty was replaced and Michael Bates, who had been chargé d'affaires in Bratislava, became the first resident Ambassador to Slovakia.

List of heads of mission

Ambassadors to Czechoslovakia

Ambassadors to Slovakia
1993–1994: David Brighty
1994–1995: Michael Bates
1995–1998: Peter Harborne
1998–2001: David Lyscom
2001–2003: Ric Todd
2003–2007: Judith Macgregor
2007–2010: Michael Roberts
2011 Jan-Aug: Dominic Schroeder chargé d'affaires
2011–2013: Susannah Montgomery
2013–2014: Gill Fraser chargé d'affaires

2014–2020: Andrew Garth
2020: Nigel Baker

References

External links
UK and Slovakia, gov.uk

Slovakia
 
United Kingdom